Herbert Alward was an Austrian figure skater who competed in men's singles.

He won the bronze medal in men's single skating at the 1938 World Figure Skating Championships.

Competitive highlights 

Note: "Gau-Championships" ("Ostmark" Championships) were held instead of Austrian Championships from 1938 to 1943.

References 

Austrian male single skaters
Date of birth missing
Date of death missing